Dar Daouletli is an old palace in the medina of Tunis.

Etymology 
The palace got its name from one of his previous owners, the daouletli (Turkish word that derives from the Arabic word daoula meaning «government») or dey.

Localization 
It is located in El Driba street, near Sidi Ben Arous Street.

History 
The palace was built in the 17th century. On 19 October 1992, it became an official historical monument.
Nowadays, it is the main office of Rachidia.

Gallery

References 

Daouletli